Guido Mutis Carrasco (5 August 1934 in Yungay, Chile – 10 July 2008 in Valdivia, Chile) was an English literature professor at the Valdivia campus of the Austral University of Chile and director of the Valdivia International Film Festival. During his life he made important contributions to national cinema studies and Chilean literature.

Education
Guido studied to be an English professor at the Universidad de Chile. He finished his bachelor's degree in 1959 and then completed a master's degree at the Central Connecticut State University, United States, in 1960 after receiving a Fulbright scholarship. In 1972, he carried out post-graduate studies at the University of East Anglia, Great Britain.

Teaching
Guido entered the Austral University on 10 April 1961. During his academic career he was employed as head of the Language Department between 1966 and 1969, director of the Literature and Culture Area of the Department (1976–1990), director of the Institute of English and North American Literature (1976–1990), director of the Language Institute (1976–1990), vice-dean of the Faculty of Philosophy and Letters (June 1968 - August 1969) and dean of the same faculty (29 November 1968 – 10 August 1969).

Between 1961 and 2002, he gave a range of courses about the English language, literature, fiction, cinema, and cinematic appreciation. Then in 2003 and 2004 he taught classes in literature and cinema, hispanoamerican literature, and Latin American cinema at the University of Oregon, USA.

Other work
Guido was active in directing seminars and frequently published articles in specialised journals. He also assisted in scientific events both in Chile and internationally. In the central and southern regions of Chile, he held workshops and gave talks in many different cities including those as a representative of the Ministry of Education (Chile).

Outside the academic world, he developed work involved with literature and cinema. Among his own personal works, he wrote stories, plays and a musical comedy and directed videos which were presented in a number of cinematographic events. He also worked in radio, and had a radio programme dedicated to music and cinema on Radio UACH, the university radio station.

Influences

Guidos' favourite genre was film noir and in later years greatly admired the work of David Cronenberg.

Director of the Valdivia International Film Festival

Guido Mutis was named director of the Valdivia International Film Festival in September 2006, only twelve days before the 13th Festival ended. He replaced Lucy Berkhoff, creator of the Festival, as the new director and headed the 2007 Festival, the 14th version since its conception.

Death and Afterwards
Guido died on 10 July 2008 in the midst of preparing the 15th Festival which occurred between 3 and 8 October and was dedicated to his legacy and memory. He was buried in Valdivia.

He has been remembered in works of literature including the publication "Gárgola. La Aventura del Espectáculo" by poet and mathematician Lionel Henríquez who launched the book, which Guido had been involved with, in the professor's memory. At a remembrance service at the Austral University to pay hommage to Guido, an extract from his unpublished autobiographic novel "Fragmentos de la Historia de Nikos" was read by the Valdivian musician José Manuel Izquierdo.

References

External links
Videotaped interview, recorded by a student on 25 September 2006

1934 births
2008 deaths
University of Chile alumni
Central Connecticut State University alumni
Alumni of the University of East Anglia
Academic staff of the Austral University of Chile
People from Diguillín Province
People from Valdivia